Campsomerini is a cosmopolitan tribe of the family Scoliidae. An alternative representation is as a subfamily, Campsomerinae.

Genera
Genera within this tribe include:

References

Scoliidae
Parasitic wasps